is a former Japanese footballer who last played for Kataller Toyama.

Club career statistics
Updated to 2 February 2018.

References

External links
Profile at Kataller Toyama

1983 births
Living people
Fukuoka University alumni
People from Ōnojō
Association football people from Fukuoka Prefecture
Japanese footballers
J1 League players
J2 League players
J3 League players
Sagan Tosu players
Tokushima Vortis players
Kataller Toyama players
Association football midfielders